Valérie Boyer (born 11 June 1962) is a French politician serving as a Senator for Bouches-du-Rhône since 2020. A member of The Republicans (LR), she was previously elected to the National Assembly from 2007 until 2020. Boyer has also been a municipal councillor of Marseille since 2001.

Early life
Boyer was born on 11 June 1962 in Bourges. Her parents were born in Algeria and Tunis during French colonial occupation. They were pieds noirs who fled from Algeria in 1962.

Political career
First elected to the municipal council of Marseille in the 2001 election, she became a member of the National Assembly in 2007. In 2020, she was elected to the Senate. Boyer also served as a deputy (adjointe) to Mayor Jean-Claude Gaudin from 2008 to 2014 and held the mayorship of the 6th sector (11th and 12th arrondissements) of Marseille from 2014 to 2017.

Ahead of the presidential election in 2017, Boyer served as campaign spokesperson for François Fillon alongside Jérôme Chartier, as a party affiliate. In The Republicans' 2017 leadership election, she endorsed Laurent Wauquiez. Following his election, she was appointed the party's deputy secretary general in charge of relations with civil society.

In Parliament, Boyer serves as member of the Committee on Foreign Affairs. In addition to her committee assignments, she is a member of the parliamentary friendship groups with Jordan, Armenia and South Sudan.

She was elected to the French Senate in the 2020 French Senate election, and was replaced in the Assembly by Julien Ravier.

Political positions
Boyer first drew attention in 2008 when she drafted a law which would make the promotion of extreme dieting a crime punishable by up to two years in prison and a fine of some $45,000; it passed the National Assembly, but later failed in the Senate. In 2009, she proposed a bill to punish advertisements which include anorexic models. She proposed to fine offenders with up to 30,000 euros.

On 22 December 2011, the National Assembly adopted a bill presented by Boyer, penalising denial of the Armenian genocide. This decision caused a controversy between France and Turkey. In the days that followed, she claimed to have received death and rape threats. No one was actually charged with these allegations. Turkish hackers took down the French Senate's website in order to protest the bill.

In 2019, Boyer opposed a bioethics law extending to homosexual and single women free access to fertility treatments such as in vitro fertilisation (IVF) under France's national health insurance; it was one of the campaign promises of President Emmanuel Macron and marked the first major social reform of his five-year term.

Personal life
Boyer is a divorced mother of three.

References

External links
 (French) Senate website

1962 births
Living people
Sciences Po Aix alumni
Politicians from Bourges
Union for a Popular Movement politicians
The Republicans (France) politicians
The Popular Right
Women members of the National Assembly (France)
Deputies of the 13th National Assembly of the French Fifth Republic
Deputies of the 14th National Assembly of the French Fifth Republic
Deputies of the 15th National Assembly of the French Fifth Republic
Women members of the Senate (France)
Senators of Bouches-du-Rhône
21st-century French women politicians
French Senators of the Fifth Republic
Mayors of places in Provence-Alpes-Côte d'Azur
French city councillors
Members of Parliament for Bouches-du-Rhône